Benjamin Parsons Collins (born 15 January 2000) is an Australian professional soccer player who plays as a defender for Western United.

Club career
Collins began his senior career with Northcote City in the NPL Victoria and NPL Victoria 2.

In early 2021, he joined the Western United NPL side in NPL Victoria 3, serving as team captain. He played in every match of the season, prior to the season's cancellation due to the COVID-19 pandemic. Afterwards, he began training with the first team.

In November 2021, Collins signed a one-year scholarship deal with Western United. He made his professional debut on 7 December 2021 in an FFA Cup match against A-League Men side Wellington Phoenix.

Career statistics

References

External links

2000 births
Living people
Association football defenders
Australian soccer players
Northcote City FC players
Western United FC players
A-League Men players
National Premier Leagues players